Hawkinsville, Tennessee is an unincorporated community in Dyer County.

Information

References

External links

Unincorporated communities in Dyer County, Tennessee
Unincorporated communities in Tennessee